Benjamin Curtis (September 23, 1978 – December 29, 2013) was an American guitarist.  He was a member of bands Tripping Daisy, Secret Machines and School of Seven Bells.

History
Curtis cited guitarists such as Michael Rother, Yoshimi P-We, and The Edge of U2 as some of his primary influences on guitar. He played a heavily effects-laden spacy style of guitar, reminiscent of late 1960s and early 1970s psychedelic rock.

Personal life
Curtis was in a relationship with his School of Seven Bells bandmate Alejandra Deheza from 2005 until 2010. The pair remained close friends and bandmates until Curtis' death.  In the liner notes for School of Seven Bells' final album SVIIB, Deheza refers to Curtis as her "best friend and soulmate."

Illness and death
Curtis announced in late February 2013 that he had been diagnosed with T-cell lymphoblastic lymphoma. A benefit concert was held in New York in August 2013 and included performances by members of the Strokes and Interpol.  Curtis died on December 29, 2013, at Memorial Sloan Kettering Cancer Center in New York.

References

External links
 Secret Machines official website
 School of Seven Bells Official website - archived on November 5, 2012.

2013 deaths
American male guitarists
American rock guitarists